22nd Street is an arterial road in Saskatoon, Saskatchewan. It begins as 22nd Street East in the Central Business District. Going west it passes the Midtown Plaza and TCU Place. At the intersection with Idylwyld Drive, it becomes 22nd Street West. Through the inner city neighbourhoods of Caswell Hill, Riversdale, Westmount, and Pleasant Hill, it contains a mixture of commercial and residential development. It then connects with Circle Drive via an interchange. Next to the interchange is the Confederation Mall. Across from that is a Real Canadian Superstore. From there is passes by the neighbourhoods of Pacific Heights, Blairmore, and Kensington. The road then heads out of the city and continues on as Highway 14.

Prior to 2005, 22nd Street used to turn southwest near the present-day Hart Road intersection and continue as Highway 7, while traffic had to leave the roadway to follow Highway 14. The roadway was removed to make way Blairmore Suburban Centre, with 22nd Street transitioning directly to Highway 14, while Highway 7 temporarily followed Betts Avenue from 2005-2012 and then was moved to its permanent realignment via Nault Road.

For the portion of Saskatoon west of the South Saskatchewan River, 22nd Street serves as the dividing line between "North" and "South" addresses.

Major intersections
From east to west.

References

Streets in Saskatoon